Davey Gray (born 28 July 1954) is an Irish rower. He competed in the men's coxed four event at the 1980 Summer Olympics.

References

External links
 

1954 births
Living people
Irish male rowers
Olympic rowers of Ireland
Rowers at the 1980 Summer Olympics
Place of birth missing (living people)
People educated at Bangor Grammar School